"Rock DJ" is a song by English singer and songwriter Robbie Williams, featured on his third studio album, Sing When You're Winning (2000). The song was released on 31 July 2000 as the lead single from the album. It samples Barry White's song "It's Ecstasy When You Lay Down Next to Me", "Can I Kick It?" by A Tribe Called Quest and has a quote from "La Di Da Di" by Slick Rick and Doug E. Fresh.

"Rock DJ" reached number one in Costa Rica, Iceland, Ireland, New Zealand, and the United Kingdom whilst reaching the top 10 in Australia, Austria, Germany, Italy, Norway, Spain, and Switzerland. It was the fourth-best-selling song of 2000 in the UK. The music video features Williams trying to impress a female DJ by stripping naked and eventually resorting to removing his skin and muscles, ending up as a skeleton. The song won British Single of the Year, and the video won British Video of the Year at the 2001 Brit Awards.

Chart performance
The song became Robbie Williams' third number-one solo single in the United Kingdom, going on to sell over 600,000 copies and being certified Platinum by the BPI. The song also became a smash hit around Europe, charting inside the top ten in most countries and becoming his first number-one single in New Zealand, Argentina and Mexico. The song also became a top five hit in Australia, where it went on to sell over 70,000 copies, being certified Platinum by the ARIA. However, success in the United States was limited, reaching number 24 on Billboard's Hot Dance Club Play but failing to chart inside the Hot 100. "Rock DJ" went on to sell almost 4 million copies worldwide. The song was named the Best Song of 2000 at the MTV Europe Music Awards and Best Single and Best Video at the Brits 2001.

Music videos
The accompanying music video for "Rock DJ" was directed by Vaughan Arnell. It was released on 6 July. It begins with Williams dancing on a roller disco with women skating around him. He wants to get the attention of the female DJ (played by Lauren Gold) standing above the stage, so he begins taking off his clothes. She ignores him at first, but after she finally notices he is completely naked, he proceeds with stripping off his skin, muscles and organs, until the only thing left of him are his bones, which is performed by special effects. In the end, the DJ dances with his skeleton. The video ends with the note, "No Robbies were Harmed During the Making of this Video", a jocular take on the "No animals were harmed" note. The skinless Robbie also appears on the single's cover art, as well as on the cover of the DVD release of In and Out of Consciousness: Greatest Hits 1990–2010 in 2010.

The video's ending (beginning with Williams taking off his skin) was cut by most music channels around Europe, including VIVA, MCM, The Box and VH1 Europe. However, in the recent years, some of the music channels in Europe (including MTV Classic and VH1 Europe) airs the "studio recording" version of the music video, even on late night, which made the edited version of the music video fall into obscurity. Examples of TV stations that still play the full video are Bulgarian channel MM, former German located channel B.TV (often in daytime) and Canadian channel MusiquePlus, some channels ran the edited video during the day and the unedited one overnight, while The Hits played a version which cut from Williams dancing in his underwear to dancing as a skeleton, filling the gap by repeating previous footage. This is the version that is currently played on channels owned by The Box Plus Network. In 2001, "Rock DJ" won the MTV Video Music Award for Best Special Effects. In 2006, it was voted by viewers as the seventh Most Groundbreaking Video Ever on MTV and in 2007 it was ranked at number 48 on MuchMusic's 50 Most Controversial Videos. The video was banned in Dominican Republic due to allegations of Satanism.

The video has been shown numerous times on Fuse's Pants-Off Dance-Off, despite its gory content. Toward the end of the dancer's dancing/stripping to it when the video is shown in the background like any other, they only show Williams, briefly, ripping and throwing his skin, and dancing in muscle form before cutting to the hostess of the show. The video appears as an instance of the re-use of the motif of "dancing with the dead" in a book about medieval images of death and dying in art and literature.

A second video shows Williams in a studio while recording the song.

Track listings
UK CD and cassette single, Australian CD single
 "Rock DJ" – 4:15
 "Talk to Me" – 3:28
 "Rock DJ" (Player One remix) – 5:34

UK DVD single
 "Rock DJ" (full length video)
 "Rock DJ" (a short documentary feature)

European CD single
 "Rock DJ" – 4:15
 "Talk to Me" – 3:28

European maxi-CD single
 "Rock DJ" – 4:15
 "Talk to Me" – 3:28
 "Rock DJ" (Player One remix) – 5:34
 "Rock DJ" (video)

Credits and personnel
Credits are taken from the Sing When You're Winning album booklet.

Studios
 Recorded at Master Rock Studios (North London, England) and Sarm Hook End (Reading, England)
 Mixed at Battery Studios (London, England)
 Mastered at Metropolis Mastering (London, England)

Personnel

 Robbie Williams – writing, lead vocals
 Guy Chambers – writing, all keyboards, production, arrangement
 Kelvin Andrews – writing
 Nelson Pigford – writing
 Ekundayo Paris – writing
 Andy Caine – backing vocals
 Derek Green – backing vocals
 Katie Kissoon – backing vocals
 Sylvia Mason-James – backing vocals
 Tessa Niles – backing vocals
 Paul "Tubbs" Williams – backing vocals
 Steve Power – vocoder, production, mixing
 Neil Taylor – electric guitar
 Winston Blissett – bass guitar
 Andy Duncan – drum programming
 Dave Bishop – brass
 Neil Sidwell – brass
 Steve Sidwell – brass
 London Session Orchestra – orchestra
 Gavyn Wright – concertmaster
 Nick Ingman – orchestration
 Isobel Griffiths – orchestral contractor
 Steve Price – orchestral engineering
 Richard Flack – Pro Tools
 Tony Cousins – mastering

Charts

Weekly charts

Year-end charts

Decade-end charts

Certifications

Release history

Notes

References

External links
 
 

2000 songs
2000 singles
Brit Award for British Single
Capitol Records singles
Chrysalis Records singles
Irish Singles Chart number-one singles
Music video controversies
Music videos directed by Vaughan Arnell
Number-one singles in Iceland
Number-one singles in New Zealand
Number-one singles in Scotland
Robbie Williams songs
Song recordings produced by Guy Chambers
Song recordings produced by Steve Power
Songs written by Guy Chambers
UK Singles Chart number-one singles